Easdale is one of the Slate Islands, in the Firth of Lorn, Scotland. Once the centre of the Scottish slate industry, there has been some recent island regeneration by the owners. This is the smallest of the Inner Hebrides' inhabited islands and is "home to traditional white-washed cottages, a small pub and disused slate quarries". One of the latter, filled with water, is used for swimming.

A ferry sails from Easdale to Ellenabeich (Gaelic: Eilean nam Beathach) on the nearby island of Seil (Gaelic: Saoil), which is separated from Easdale by only a narrow channel. Confusingly, Ellenabeich is sometimes known as Easdale as a result of its traditional connections with the island.

Etymology
In 1549, Donald Monro, "Dean of the Isles" wrote, in brief reference to Easdale, of an island "namit in the Erische Leid Ellan Eisdcalfe" However the derivation of "Eisdcalfe" and this word's etymological relationship to "Easdale" is not clear. Haswell Smith (2004) notes that eas is Gaelic for "waterfall" and dal is Norse for "valley". Nonetheless, it is not clear why either description should apply to the island which is low lying and has no waterfalls.

The Gaelic name, Èisdeal or Eilean Èisdeal has a long vowel and local folk legend attributes this to a derivation from èist thall "listen to that yonder". Gaelic Place-Names of Scotland states that the first element is obscure, the second Norse dalr. It is not clear if this Èisdeal shares its derivation with Gleann Èisdeal (Glen Ashdale) (Glen of Ash trees) on the Isle of Arran.

Ellenbeich is usually analysed as Eilean nam Beathach "island of the animals" but this may be a reflex of an earlier and homophonous form Eilean nam Beitheach "island of the birch trees".

History
Easdale slate helped to build major cities of the British Empire and can still be seen on rooftops as far afield as Melbourne, Nova Scotia, Dunedin and Dublin. The great storm of 1850 flooded most of the quarries. Lacking any means of pumping the water away, the slate industry on the island more or less came to an abrupt end. The last slate was cut in the 1950s and the once active quarries are little more than still pools which provide a safe haven for a wide variety of flora and bird life.

This was eventually swept away by the sea and little visible sign of the island now remains.

By the early 1960s, the population had dwindled to only four people and the island appeared doomed. The island now has a population of around sixty people and is the smallest permanently inhabited island of the Inner Hebrides. The Scottish plant collector Clara Winsome Muirhead surveyed the plant life of the island and published The Flora of Easdale and the Garvellachs in 1962.

British indie rock band Florence and the Machine filmed their double-feature music video for their singles "Queen of Peace" and "Long & Lost" on the island, with the videos using the villagers as the cast.

Current ownership
The island is owned by Jonathan Feigenbaum, who operates the Easedale Island Company; he  succeeded his late father Clive Feigenbaum (the former chairman of Stanley Gibbons). Clive created local issues of stamps, and Jonathan has continued doing this.

Facilities and activities
The island is home to a folk museum owned and operated by the Eilean Eisdeal, a development trust, as well as a bar/restaurant called "The Puffer". Eilean Eisdeal spearheaded the renovation of the Easdale Island Community Hall, which provides a venue for a wide variety of events. According to Mike Scott of the Waterboys: "The Hall itself is magical. From the first sighting of its pyramid roof and arced frontispiece across the water to stepping off its stage at the end of the concert, it cast a spell on us."

In 2005 the local authority, Argyll and Bute Council, discussed plans to build a bridge between the island and Seil, linking the island to the mainland by road, despite there being no roads on Easdale. A company who operate high speed boat trips to view wild life and other local places of interest in the area have their base on Easdale.

The World Stone Skimming Championship has taken place annually in September on Easdale since 1997. In 2012 the event came under threat after Jonathan Feigenbaum requested £1,000 for using the slate quarry the championship uses. The competition only went ahead after the Press and Journal newspaper offered to pay the fee. A community buyout of the island by residents is now under consideration. Mike Russell, MSP for Argyll and Bute, said: "Not every community will achieve it and not every community should achieve it. But it is a live issue and becomes even more live in circumstances such as these."

The island gets some tourists and has some facilities, activities for visitors, B&Bs and two restaurants.

Images of the island

See also 

 List of islands of Scotland

Footnotes

References
 Gillies, Patrick Hunter (1909) Netherlorn, Argyllshire, and its neighbourhood. Virtue.

External links

  Eilean Eisdeal
 Easdale People
 Undiscovered Scotland: Easdale

 
Slate Islands
Islands of Argyll and Bute